The Parliamentary Under-Secretary of State for Growth and Rural Affairs is a junior position in the Department for Environment, Food and Rural Affairs in the British government.

Responsibilities
The Minister's responsibilities include:

Rural affairs: rural productivity and connectivity, rural life opportunities (childcare, education, skills and health)
Landscape, including National *Parks and AONBs
Access including rights of way and coastal paths
Animal and plant health
Domestic green finance and finance markets for nature and the environment
Lead for RBG Kew, Animal and Plant Health Agency, Veterinary Medicines Directorate and Animal Health and Welfare Board for England

Ministers

References

Department for Environment, Food and Rural Affairs